Carlo Simi (7 November 1924 – 26 November 2000) was an Italian architect, production designer and costume designer, who worked frequently with Sergio Leone and Sergio Corbucci, giving their Spaghetti Westerns a unique look. Most famous for his costume and set designs for Once Upon a Time in the West Simi also built the town of 'El Paso' in the Almería desert for Leone's second Western, For a Few Dollars More. Built around a massive bank, with vistas of the Tabernas Desert visible between buildings, the set still exists, as a tourist attraction called "Mini Hollywood". Simi played the bank manager in that film: it was his only acting role. He also designed the Sad Hill Cemetery for the last scene of The Good, the Bad and the Ugly.

Simi died in Rome in 2000. Some of his costumes and set designs were exhibited at the Autry National Center's Museum of the American West in Los Angeles in 2005. In 2018 he posthumously received the 'Leone in Memoriam' award by the Almería Western Film Festival for the 50 anniversary of Once Upon a Time in the West.

Filmography

As actor
For a Few Dollars More (1965) - El Paso Bank Manager (uncredited)

As costume designer
 Two Gangsters in the Wild West (1964)
 Bullets Don't Argue (1964)
 Minnesota Clay (1964)
 One Hundred Thousand Dollars for Lassiter (1966)
 Django (1966)
 Ringo and His Golden Pistol (1966)
 Texas, Adios (1966)
 El halcón y la presa (1966)
 The Good, the Bad and the Ugly (1966)
 Face to Face (1967)
 Day of Anger (1967)
 Once Upon a Time in the West (1968)
 Oro sangriento (1969)
 Blood in the Streets (1973)
 Carambola's Philosophy: In the Right Pocket (1975)
 Keoma (1976)
 Le llamaban California (1977)
 Silver Saddle (1978)
 Spaghetti (1980)

As production designer
 The Shortest Day (1963)
 Cazador de recompensas (1966)
 El genio (1975)
 Bianco, rosso e Verdone (1981)
 They Call Me Renegade (1987)
 Where the Night Begins (1991)

References

External links
 
 

1924 births
2000 deaths
Italian production designers
Italian costume designers
David di Donatello winners
Ciak d'oro winners
20th-century Italian architects
Male Spaghetti Western actors